Yoon Ji-yu (born 28 December 2000) is a South Korean para table tennis player. She won a bronze medal at the 2016 Summer Paralympics, before her 16th birthday.

She became paralyzed when she was 28 months old. Her paralysis was caused by spinal cord infarction. She has a twin sibling.

References 
 

2000 births 
Paralympic medalists in table tennis
South Korean female table tennis players 
Table tennis players at the 2016 Summer Paralympics 
Medalists at the 2016 Summer Paralympics 
Paralympic table tennis players of South Korea
Living people
Sportspeople from Gyeonggi Province
People from Yongin
Paralympic bronze medalists for South Korea
People with paraplegia
Twin sportspeople
South Korean twins
Table tennis players at the 2020 Summer Paralympics
21st-century South Korean women